was a Japanese anime episode and series director, animation director, animator, storyboard artist, and character designer. He died of lung cancer on November 8, 2007.

Works

Anime series
1960s – 1970s
 Oraa Guzura Dado (1967–1968, key animation)
 The Adventures of Hutch the Honeybee (1970–1971, key animation)
 Inakappe Taishō (1970–1972, episode director)
 Mokku of the Oak Tree (1972, episode director)
 Science Ninja Team Gatchaman (1972–1974, key animation)
 Demetan Croaker, The Boy Frog (1973, episode director)
 New Honeybee Hutch (1974, episode director)
 Hurricane Polymar (1974–1975, episode director, key animation)
 Tentōmushi no Uta (1974–1976, episode director)
 The Adventures of Pepero (1975–1976, episode director)
 Maya the Honey Bee (1975–1976, storyboards)
 Blocker Gundan 4 Machine Blaster (1976–1977, character designer)
 Chōgattai Majutsu Robo Gingaizer (1977, character designer, animation director)
 Angie Girl (1977–1978, character designer, animation director)
 Chō Super Car Gattiger (1977–1978, chief director, episode director)
 Gatchaman II (1978–1979, episode director)
 Tōshō Daimos (1978–1979, animation director)
 Uchū Majin Daikengō (1978–1979, character designer, animation director)
 Daltanius (1979-1980, storyboards)
 The Ultraman (1979–1980, storyboards)

1980s
 The Wonderful Adventures of Nils (1980-1981, episode director, key animation)
 Trider G7 (1980–1981, storyboards)
 Belle and Sebastian (1981-1982, animation director, storyboards)
 Saikyō Robo Daiōja (1981-1982, episode director)
 Yattodetaman (1981–1982, opening animation)
 Urusei Yatsura (1981-1986, episode director, animation director, storyboards)
 The Mysterious Cities of Gold (1982–1983, storyboards)
 The New Adventures of Maya the Honeybee (1982–1983, storyboards)
 Armored Trooper Votoms (1983–1984, storyboards)
 Creamy Mami, the Magic Angel (1983-1984, key animation, storyboards)
 Bismark (1984–1985, animation director, storyboards)
 Osomatsu-kun (1988-1989, animation director, storyboards)
 Madō King Granzort (1989–1990, storyboards)

1990s
 Heisei Tensai Bakabon (1990, animation director, storyboards)
 Ore wa Chokkaku (1991, animation director, storyboards)
 Marude Dameo (1991-1992, animation director, storyboards)
 Mama wa Shōgaku 4 Nensei (1992, storyboards)
 YuYu Hakusho (1992–1995, animation director, storyboards)
 Ninku (1995-1996, animation director, storyboards)
 Midori no Makibaō (1996–1997, animation director, storyboards)
 Flame of Recca (1997-1998, animation director, storyboards)
 Takoyaki Mantoman (1998–1999, animation director, storyboards)

2000s
 Tokyo Mew Mew (2000-2003, animation director, storyboards)
 Detective School Q (2003–2004, animation director, storyboards)
 Bleach (2004–2007, animation director, storyboards, sub-character design)

Sources:

OVAs
 Cosmo Police Justy (1985, director, animation director)
 Fire Tripper (1985, director, animation director)
 Maris the Chojo (1986, director)
 Laughing Target (1987, director, animation director
 Harbor Light Story Fashion Lala yori (1988, director, animation director)

Sources:

Anime films
 Mysterious Thief Lupin: The Riddle of 813 (1979, storyboards)
 Macross: Do You Remember Love? (1984, key animation)
 Project A-ko (1986, animation)
 Aitsu to Lullaby: Suiyōbi no Cinderella (1987, director)
 Bleach: The DiamondDust Rebellion (2007, died during production)

Sources:

Other works
 The Irresponsible Captain Tylor Music Clip (1994, character designer, key animation, storyboards)

Sources:

References

External links
 
 

1941 births
2007 deaths
Anime character designers
Japanese animated film directors
Anime directors
Deaths from lung cancer in Japan
Japanese animators
People from Ishinomaki
Japanese storyboard artists